Christmas in Iceland (Jól) starts four weeks before proper Christmas, which begins on 24 December (Aðfangadagur) and ends thirteen days later on 6 January (Epiphany).

Traditionally, one candle is lit each Sunday, until four candles are lit on the 24th. At 6:00 p.m. church bells ring to start the Christmas celebration. The religiously observant and/or traditional Icelanders will attend mass at this time, while the secular Icelanders will begin their holiday meal immediately. After the meal is finished, they open gifts and spend the evening together. In Iceland people over the Yule holidays most often eat smoked lamb, ptarmigan, and turkey. Pork is also very popular.

Thirteen days before 24 December, children will leave their shoes by a window so that the 13 Yule Lads (jólasveinarnir) can leave small gifts in their shoes. The Yule Lads are the sons of two trolls, Grýla and Leppalúði, living in the Icelandic mountains. Each of the Yule Lads is known for a different kind of mischief (for example slamming doors, stealing meat, stealing milk or eating the candles). Yule Lads traditionally wear early Icelandic wool clothing but are now known for the more recognizable red and white suit.

Each home typically sets up a Christmas tree indoors in the living room, with most decorating it on 11 December. In addition to the decorations, presents are put underneath the tree. It is also a tradition in many homes to boil fish (skate) on the 23rd. The day is known as Saint Thorlak mass (Þorláksmessa).

During the holiday season, it is traditional for families to work together to bake small cookies to serve or give to guests. Most common are thin gingerbread cookies which are decorated in many different colors of glaze. Many families also follow the tradition of making  laufabrauð, a flat thin bread that is cut out using a special tool and folding technique.

The end of year is divided between two days: the Old Year's Day (Gamlársdagur) and the New Year's Day (Nýársdagur). At the night of the former and morning of the latter, Icelanders shoot up fireworks, blowing the old year away and welcoming the new one.

Thirteen days after the 24th, Icelanders say goodbye to the Yule Lads and other mystical creatures such as elves and trolls. There are bonfires held throughout the country while the elves, Yule Lads, and Icelanders dance together before saying goodbye until the next Christmas. This celebration is known elsewhere as Epiphany Day.

See also
Icelandic Christmas folklore
Iceland at Christmas worldwide
Icelandic Christmas book flood
Jólaöl
 Yule
 Jul (Denmark)
 Jul (Norway)
 Jul (Sweden)

References

Further reading
 Rognvaldottir, Nanna. Countdown to Christmas: Festive Icelandic recipes and lore. 2022. Forlaid. ISBN 978997910549

External links
 Celebrations in Iceland – National Museum of Iceland

 
December observances
Religious festivals in Iceland
Traditions
Cultural festivals in Iceland
Winter events in Iceland